Pasqualini is a surname. Notable people with the surname include:

Alessandro Pasqualini (1493–1559), Italian Renaissance architect
Jean Pasqualini, French, Corsican and Chinese journalist
Marc'Antonio Pasqualini (1614–1691), Italian castrato opera singer
Lorenzo Pasqualini (born 1989), Italian footballer

See also
Pascal (disambiguation)
Pasqual (disambiguation)
Pascual (disambiguation)
Pasquale (disambiguation)